Robert Allan (10 February 1872 – 14 November 1918) was a Scottish footballer who played as an outside-right for West Ham United and its predecessor club Thames Ironworks. He had previously played for Dundee.

Allan started his career at Dundee, making 11 total appearances and scoring 4 goals, including a hat-trick in a Scottish Cup match against King's Park in January 1897. Finding first-team opportunities limited, he joined Thames Ironworks in 1899. There, he made 22 consecutive appearances in the Southern League Division One, between his debut against Southampton on 16 December and the end-of-season test match against Fulham on 30 April. Usually occupying the outside-right position, he was also played at inside-left and at right-half. His only goal came in a 4–1 victory over Southampton on 9 April 1900. He also made seven consecutive appearances in the Thames & Medway Combination. After the winding up of Thames Ironworks and the formation of West Ham United, Allan continued to play for the new club, making 57 appearances over three seasons. His only goal for United came against Wellingborough Town on 27 December 1901.

The club handbook from 1900–01 featured the following description of Allan:

References

Bibliography

External links
Robert Allan at westhamstats.info

1872 births
1918 deaths
People from Lesmahagow
Footballers from South Lanarkshire
Scottish footballers
Association football outside forwards
Thames Ironworks F.C. players
West Ham United F.C. players
Southern Football League players
Dundee F.C. players
Scottish Football League players